Chris Scheels (born February 7, 1977) is an American speed skater. She competed in the women's 3000 metres at the 1994 Winter Olympics.

References

External links
 

1977 births
Living people
American female speed skaters
Olympic speed skaters of the United States
Speed skaters at the 1994 Winter Olympics
People from West Allis, Wisconsin
Sportspeople from the Milwaukee metropolitan area
21st-century American women